Margaret Scobie (born 1948 in Woola Downs, Utopia, Northern Territory, Australia) is an Australian Aboriginal artist from the Anmatyerre community, just north of Alice Springs.

Scobie is from one of the most famous Aboriginal artistic families, related to other Aboriginal artists such as Emily Kame Kngwarreye (her aunt), Gloria Petyarre (first cousin), Kathleen Petyarre, Anna Petyarre, and Ada Bird Petyarre.

Margaret Scobie was educated at Ross Park Primary School in Alice Springs. She was introduced to painting at "Awelye" ceremonies and has been a painter for most of her life.

Scobie's painting is to be found in a number of art galleries including the Aboriginal Art Store, the Clare Valley Art Gallery, Didgeridoo Hut & Art Gallery, Doongal Aboriginal Art, Galeria Aniela, and Gallery Gondwana. Most of her artworks depict bush medicine leaves, spinifex grass and Awelye.

Margaret Scobie has three daughters and one son.

See also
 Dreaming (Australian Aboriginal art)
 The Dreaming
 List of Indigenous Australian visual artists

References

External links
 Margaret Scobie at Artnet
 Margaret Scobie at Aboriginal Art
 Margaret Scobie at Aboriginal Art Galleries
 Margaret Scobie at MutualArt
 https://aboriginalartpaintings.com/the-artists/margaret-scobie

1945 births
Living people
Australian Aboriginal artists
People from Alice Springs
Artists from the Northern Territory
20th-century Australian painters
20th-century Australian women artists
21st-century Australian painters
21st-century Australian women artists
Australian women painters